Rippee Creek is a stream in southern Douglas County, Missouri. The stream starts in a hillside valley just east of Squires at an elevation just above 1200 feet and flows eastward past the Girdner community on Missouri Route P and on to its confluence with Bryant Creek at an elevation of 781 feet within the Rippee State Wildlife Management Area.

References

Rivers of Douglas County, Missouri
Rivers of Missouri